Lincoln Academy (Lincoln or LA) is a private boarding and day school and town academy located in Newcastle, Maine, serving students in Lincoln County, the United States, and other nations around the world. Lincoln Academy is the fourth oldest secondary school in Maine. The majority of Lincoln Academy students live in local sending towns, including Newcastle, Damariscotta, Bristol, Jefferson, Nobleboro, and South Bristol. Similar to other town academies, the sending towns pay tuition for local students.

History 
In 1801, the General Court of Massachusetts established Lincoln Academy to promote "Piety, Religion and Morality". 178 people from nine towns signed the original petition and donated over $3,000 to found the school. Lincoln Academy opened in October 1805 in a wooden building on River Road in Newcastle with 74 students. The tuition cost $257 per year and was paid by students' families. Later in 1828, a fire destroyed the original building and a new one was constructed on Academy Hill road. To this day, the building supporting the bell tower serves as the central building of the high school. 

Lincoln Academy formerly served as a "fitting school for Bowdoin College" from 1805 until 1903. The Maine Legislature then passed a law that mandated secondary education be funded by the local towns. As a result, many adults enrolled at LA causing an increase in enrollment and a dramatic change in the nature of the student body. By 1906, the school body was composed of those preparing for Bowdoin College with a required exam for admission. The exam was later discontinued in the 1930s resulting in Lincoln becoming a public high school. Enrollment increased during the 1950s and 1960s and increased again upon the closure of Bristol High School in 1969.

In the 1970s, the school eliminated differentiated diplomas, and course and graduation requirements were increased. Later, the school joined the Bath Regional Vocational Program and then Rockland Vocational Center. Today, Lincoln Academy serves as a private high school for students from surrounding towns.

In 2018, the school is met with a dip in enrollment due to fewer Chinese students studying abroad as Lincoln Academy's majority of international students are from China.

The President's aim to limit visa applications and banning travel from some countries adds to international students' difficulty to study in the United States.

The school also stated that "American-style" education models are being used in China creating less of a demand to study in the United States. In addition to Lincoln Academy, schools across New England have also suffered from a decline in international student enrollment due to a decreased interest in traveling and studying in the United States.

In 2011, Lincoln Academy was $1.25 million in debt with a $5 million endowment. Over several years, the school fell into a $10 million debt with only $7.5 million endowment in 2016. There was some conflict within the board of trustees as to finding solutions to the fixing the debt.
On April 17, 2015, Lincoln Academy celebrated with Maine State Senator Angus King the grand opening of the newly constructed Cable-Burns Applied Technology and Engineering Center (abbreviated as ATEC) and a new dormitory for residential students. The ATEC building offers flexible, modern classroom space for traditionally-offered course such as Digital Media Production, Small Engines, Digital Photography, Human Anatomy and Physiology, Computer-Aided Design (CAD), as well as new courses such as Engineering, Invent to Learn, and Metal Sculpture.

The new dorm houses 54 residential students and five faculty families. Having 84 residential students on campus has expanded the diversity of the Lincoln Academy student population and has allowed the school to maintain its budget and wide range of classes during a time of shrinking student population of the Mid Coast.

On September 25, a new synthetic surface field was dedicated in honor of Lincoln Academy graduate, William A. Clark II. The field's construction was possible because of an anonymous donation. Prior to the construction of the field, Lincoln Academy "has struggled with maintaining an adequate baseball and soccer field". Because of construction of the new dormitory and ATEC building, the conditions of the fields declined, according to school officials. The school built a new baseball complex on campus and the school dedicated Bowers Field in 2016 in honor of a former trustee.

Founders 
Rev. Kiah Bayley
Samuel Nickels
Rev. Jonathan Ward
Rev. Alden Bradford
Hon. Thomas Rice
Rev. William Riddle
Thomas McClure
Rev. John Sawyer
William McCobb
David Dennis
Mr. Matthew Cottrell
Henry Knox
Mr. Moses Carlton
Sir Ashton IV

Athletics 

Lincoln Academy has various varsity sports teams, including Baseball, Basketball, Cheerleading, Cross country running, Field hockey, Golf, Lacrosse, Soccer, Swimming, Track and field, Tennis, and Wrestling.

LA is a member of the Kennebec Valley Athletic Conference, and has won several State Championships.

 Boys' Basketball - (Class B) 1989
 Girls' Basketball - (Class B) 1982
 Boys' Cross Country - (Class B) 2017
 Girls' Field Hockey - (Class B) 1987
 Boys' Soccer - (Class B) 1982, 1987
 Boys' Outdoor Track and Field - (Class S) 1959
 Girls' Tennis - (Class B) 2018, 2019, 2022

Notable alumni

Kate Aldrich, mezzo-soprano
Anna Belknap, actress
Glenn Chadbourne, artist
Jessica Delfino, singer-songwriter
Edwin Flye, politician
Ryan Gaul, actor
Chloe Maxmin, politician
Cameron Reny, politician

References

External links 
 
 History of Lincoln Academy

Educational institutions established in 1801
Schools in Lincoln County, Maine
Private high schools in Maine
1801 establishments in Maine